Greenbrier is a city in Faulkner County, Arkansas, United States. It is part of the Little Rock–North Little Rock–Conway Metropolitan Statistical Area. The population was 5,707 at the 2020 census, up from 4,706 at the 2010 census.

History 

Prior to European settlement, Native American tribes, including the Quapaw and later the Cherokee, lived in the area. Several historical figures of the Wild West such as Jim Bowie and Jesse James passed through the Greenbrier region toward Oklahoma and Texas. In 1837, Jonathan Hardin settled near the Wiley settlement. Also in the early 19th century, the Casharagos settled north of Greenbrier in the present community of Republican.

Greenbrier is a town that developed from a minor brothel on the Butterfield Stagecoach route into a bustling city. The town was named for the greenbriar vines which grew along the creek through the town. Recent years have seen continued growth as Greenbrier becomes a bedroom community for Conway. As early as 1818 settlers were in the vicinity of what is now Greenbrier. Mooresville was given as the name for this fast growing community. It was later changed to Greenbrier when the first post office was established on September 15, 1857. Henderson Moore was the first postmaster.

Greenbrier was incorporated as a town on April 5, 1880, with an estimated population of 300 people. Hardin Township at this time had 886 people and Cadron Township had 2,916 people. 
In 1905 Greenbrier could boast of eight general stores, three grist mills, four cotton gins, a steam sawmill and a shingle mill, three churches, a six-room school building, and 350 people.

There was a period of uncertainty from 1920 to 1940. Floods, droughts, and the Great Depression of 1930-1935 plagued Greenbrier and the social and cultural atmosphere displayed the feelings of uncertainty and dismay. As adjustments were made to the natural physical setbacks, there emerged a conservative type of culture. Some businesses closed permanently, others changed hands several times. Only a few stayed in business the entire period from 1920 to 1940. After 1935 the New Deal ushered in activities that provided employment which gave a new spurt of life.

The next two decades saw a reprieve from the earlier stagnation and people were again motivated to make Greenbrier into a thriving village. The relocation of U.S. Highway 65 through Greenbrier in 1942 gave a real boost to the town. Following the drought of 1950, a rapid movement from cotton to dairy and livestock farming was observed. The income from the average farm tripled.

On September 9, 1949, the townspeople elected Hugh Henry as mayor; P.B. Matthews, recorder; Joe Castleberry, treasurer; and these five aldermen: Div Williams, W.A. Dillaha, Marvin Cantrell, S.C. Case and C.R. Denton. J.A. Dickens was elected marshal. Mayors since 1949 have been: Royce Williams, Howard Lawrence, Percy Matthews (acting due to the resignation of Howard Lawrence), Cecil Garrett, Eddie Garrett (no relation), and D.P. (Press) Kelso.

The population in the incorporated area in 1980 was 1,423.

Geography
Greenbrier is located in northwestern Faulkner County at  (35.229444, -92.389052).

Demographics

2020 census

As of the 2020 United States census, there were 5,707 people, 2,014 households, and 1,365 families residing in the city.

2000 census
As of the census of 2000, there were 3,042 people, 1,137 households, and 892 families residing in the city. The racial makeup of the city was 97.37% White, 0.59% Black or African American, 0.46% Native American, 0.07% Asian, 0.36% from other races, and 1.15% from two or more races.  0.99% of the population were Hispanic or Latino of any race.

There were 1,137 households, out of which 42.5% had children under the age of 18 living with them, 61.7% were married couples living together, 13.2% had a female householder with no husband present, and 21.5% were non-families. 19.1% of all households were made up of individuals, and 7.0% had someone living alone who was 65 years of age or older.  The average household size was 2.68 and the average family size was 3.06.

In the city, the population was spread out, with 30.3% under the age of 18, 9.1% from 18 to 24, 31.9% from 25 to 44, 18.9% from 45 to 64, and 9.8% who were 65 years of age or older.  The median age was 32 years. For every 100 females, there were 92.3 males.  For every 100 females age 18 and over, there were 86.6 males.

The median income for a household in the city was $37,351, and the median income for a family was $43,125. Males had a median income of $28,699 versus $24,630 for females. The per capita income for the city was $17,950.  About 7.2% of families and 9.1% of the population were below the poverty line, including 11.0% of those under age 18 and 10.5% of those age 65 or over.

Education 
Public education for elementary and secondary school students is primarily provided by the Greenbrier School District, which leads to graduation from Greenbrier High School. Greenbrier was ranked #1 School District in the State.

Earthquake swarm

On February 27, 2011, a magnitude 4.7 earthquake hit just outside Greenbrier. The quake was felt in several adjacent states, and as far away as Iowa. A swarm of almost 800 earthquakes have hit Arkansas since September 2010.

Politics
Greenbrier is represented in the Arkansas House of Representatives by the Republican Stephen Meeks.

References

External links
City of Greenbrier official website

Cities in Arkansas
Cities in Faulkner County, Arkansas
Cities in Little Rock–North Little Rock–Conway metropolitan area